Róbert Örlschléger (born 1 October 1956) is a Hungarian rowing coxswain. He competed in the men's eight event at the 1972 Summer Olympics.

References

1956 births
Living people
Hungarian male rowers
Olympic rowers of Hungary
Rowers at the 1972 Summer Olympics
Rowers from Budapest
Coxswains (rowing)